In statistics, intra-rater reliability is the degree of agreement among repeated administrations of a diagnostic test performed by a single rater. Intra-rater reliability and inter-rater reliability are aspects of test validity.

See also

 Inter-rater reliability
 Rating (pharmaceutical industry)
 Reliability (statistics)
 Repeatability
 Test-retest reliability

References

Comparison of assessments
Statistical reliability